Victor Simon Badawi (born February 17, 1980) is an Indonesian footballer who currently plays for Mitra Kukar in the Indonesia Super League.

References

External links

1980 births
Living people
People from Kutai Kartanegara Regency
Indonesian footballers
Liga 1 (Indonesia) players
Mitra Kukar players
Persita Tangerang players
Indonesian Premier Division players
Persema Malang players
Persisam Putra Samarinda players
PSIR Rembang players
Association football defenders
Sportspeople from East Kalimantan
21st-century Indonesian people